Scaniarinken (formerly the AXA Sports Center) is an indoor sporting arena located in Södertälje, Sweden that was built and then opened on 2 October 1970 as Scaniarinken, with an ice hockey game where Södertälje SK defeated Djurgårdens IF, 5–2 The capacity of the arena is 6,200, but before it was renovated in 2005 it could host much larger numbers, with the record being 11,372 people. It is the home arena of the Södertälje SK ice hockey team and the Axa/Marlboro curling team.

The arena was reconstructed in 2005, and renamed from Scaniarinken to AXA Sports Center. In February 2016 the arena was re-named back to Scaniarinken as the 10-year title deal with Axa expired.

References

External links

Hockeyarenas.net entry

Indoor ice hockey venues in Sweden
Ice hockey venues in Sweden
Sport in Södertälje
Axa
Buildings and structures in Stockholm County
Sports venues completed in 1970
1970 establishments in Sweden